Csengőd is a village in Bács-Kiskun County, in the Southern Great Plain region of Hungary.

Croats in Hungary call this village as Čengid.

Geography

References 

Populated places in Bács-Kiskun County